Iris purdyi is a species of iris known by the common name Purdy's iris, named after Carl Purdy.  It is found in the redwood forests of California and into southern Oregon, and hence is also known as the redwood iris.  The plant flowers from April to June.

Description

Leaves
The leaves are green and usually tinted along the edges with pink.  There is a closed spathe which is green with red edges.

Flowers
The flowers are light yellow and lavender, often veined with darker coloring, and are hermaphrodite.  The stigma is rounded, truncate or bilobed and often edged with small teeth, it is the only species of Iris ser. Californicae not to have a triangular or tongue shaped stigma.

Seeds
The seeds are D-shaped or irregular, light brown and wrinkled.

Status
While once common, disturbance caused by logging and opening up new highways has allowed other species to move in, in particular I. douglasiana and I. macrosiphon, and the resulting hybrids are abundant.

Location
The iris is found in Humboldt, Mendocino, Sonoma and Trinity counties in California, and in southern Oregon.

Hybridization
Iris purdyi hybridizes with I. bracteata, I. chrysophylla, I. douglasiana, I. innominata, I. macrosiphon, I. tenax, and I. tenuissima.

It is rare in its unhybridized form.

The cross with I. tenax, called "Iota", was made by the Englishman William Dykes, and was the first Californian Iris to win a Royal Horticultural Society Award of Merit, in 1914.

Uses
Traditional uses by native Americans were as a source of fibre to make rope, using the outside fibres from each leaf.  The leaves can also be used to make a light tan paper.

References

External links

 CalFlora database: Iris purdyi
 Jepson Manual Treatment
 Santa Barbara Botanic Garden where the plant is on display

purdyi
Flora of California
Flora of Oregon
Natural history of the California Coast Ranges
Endemic flora of the United States
Taxa named by Alice Eastwood
Garden plants of North America
Flora without expected TNC conservation status